A ferrite is a ceramic material made by mixing and firing large proportions of iron(III) oxide (rust) blended with small proportions of one or more additional metallic elements, such as strontium, barium, manganese, nickel, and zinc. They are ferrimagnetic, meaning they can be magnetized or attracted to a magnet.  Unlike other ferromagnetic materials, most ferrites are not electrically conductive, making them useful in applications like magnetic cores for transformers to suppress eddy currents. Ferrites can be divided into two families based on their resistance to being demagnetized (magnetic coercivity).

Hard ferrites have high coercivity, so are difficult to demagnetize. They are used to make permanent magnets for applications such as refrigerator magnets, loudspeakers, and small electric motors.

Soft ferrites have low coercivity, so they easily change their magnetization and act as conductors of magnetic fields. They are used in the electronics industry to make efficient magnetic cores called ferrite cores for high-frequency inductors, transformers and antennas, and in various microwave components.

Ferrite compounds are extremely low cost, being made of mostly iron oxide, and have excellent corrosion resistance. Yogoro Kato and Takeshi Takei of the Tokyo Institute of Technology synthesized the first ferrite compounds in 1930.

Composition, structure, and properties
Ferrites are usually ferrimagnetic ceramic compounds derived from iron oxides. Magnetite (Fe3O4) is a famous example. Like most of the other ceramics, ferrites are hard, brittle, and poor conductors of electricity.

Many ferrites adopt the spinel structure with the formula AB2O4, where A and B represent various metal cations, usually including iron (Fe). Spinel ferrites usually adopt a crystal motif consisting of cubic close-packed (fcc) oxides (O2−) with A cations occupying one eighth of the tetrahedral holes and B cations occupying half of the octahedral holes, i.e., .

Ferrite crystals do not adopt the ordinary spinel structure, but rather the inverse spinel structure: One eighth of the tetrahedral holes are occupied by B cations, one fourth of the octahedral sites are occupied by A cations. and the other one fourth by B cation. It is also possible to have mixed structure spinel ferrites with formula [M2+1−δFe3+δ][M2+δFe3+2−δ]O4 where δ is the degree of inversion.

The magnetic material known as "ZnFe" has the formula ZnFe2O4, with Fe3+ occupying the octahedral sites and Zn2+ occupy the tetrahedral sites, it is an example of normal structure spinel ferrite.

Some ferrites adopt hexagonal crystal structure, like barium and strontium ferrites BaFe12O19 (BaO:6Fe2O3) and SrFe12O19 (SrO:6Fe2O3).

In terms of their magnetic properties, the different ferrites are often classified as "soft", "semi-hard" or "hard", which refers to their low or high magnetic coercivity, as follows.

Soft ferrites

Ferrites that are used in transformer or electromagnetic cores contain nickel, zinc, and/or manganese compounds. Soft ferrites are not permanent magnets. They have magnetism (much like mild steel), but when the magnetic field is removed, the magnetism decreases. Soft ferrites are commonly used as transformers (to change the voltage from primary to secondary windings). As a result, soft ferrites are also called transformer ferrites.They have a low coercivity. The low coercivity means the material's magnetization can easily reverse direction without dissipating much energy (hysteresis losses), while the material's high resistivity prevents eddy currents in the core, another source of energy loss. Because of their comparatively low losses at high frequencies, they are extensively used in the cores of RF transformers and inductors in applications such as switched-mode power supplies and loopstick antennas used in AM radios.

The most common soft ferrites are:
 Manganese-zinc ferrite (MnZn, with the formula ). MnZn have higher permeability and saturation induction than NiZn.
 Nickel-zinc ferrite (NiZn, with the formula ). NiZn ferrites exhibit higher resistivity than MnZn, and are therefore more suitable for frequencies above 1 MHz.  

For applications below 5 MHz, MnZn ferrites are used; above that, NiZn is the usual choice. The exception is with common mode inductors, where the threshold of choice is at 70 MHz.

Semi-hard ferrites
 Cobalt ferrite, CoFe2O4 (CoO·Fe2O3), is in between soft and hard magnetic material and is usually classified as a semi-hard material. It is mainly used for its magnetostrictive applications like sensors and actuators  thanks to its high saturation magnetostriction (~200 ppm). CoFe2O4 has also the benefits to be rare-earth free, which makes it a good substitute for Terfenol-D. Moreover, its magnetostrictive properties can be tuned by inducing a magnetic uniaxial anisotropy. This can be done by magnetic annealing, magnetic field assisted compaction, or reaction under uniaxial pressure. This last solution has the advantage to be ultra fast (20 min) thanks to the use of spark plasma sintering. The induced magnetic anisotropy in cobalt ferrite is also beneficial to enhance the magnetoelectric effect in composite.

Hard ferrites
In contrast, permanent ferrite magnets are made of hard ferrites, which have a high coercivity and high remanence after magnetization. Iron oxide and barium or strontium carbonate are used in manufacturing of hard ferrite magnets. The high coercivity means the materials are very resistant to becoming demagnetized, an essential characteristic for a permanent magnet.  They also have high magnetic permeability. These so-called ceramic magnets are cheap, and are widely used in household products such as refrigerator magnets. The maximum magnetic field B is about 0.35 tesla and the magnetic field strength H is about 30 to 160 kiloampere turns per meter (400 to 2000 oersteds). The density of ferrite magnets is about 5 g/cm3.

The most common hard ferrites are:
 Strontium ferrite,  SrFe12O19 (SrO·6Fe2O3), used in small electric motors, micro-wave devices, recording media, magneto-optic media, telecommunication and electronic industry. Strontium hexaferrite (SrFe12O19) is well known for its high coercivity due to its magnetocrystalline anisotropy. It has been widely used in industrial applications as permanent magnets and, because they can be powdered and formed easily, they are finding their applications into micro and nano-types systems such as biomarkers, bio diagnostics and biosensors.
 Barium ferrite, BaFe12O19 (BaO·6Fe2O3), a common material for permanent magnet applications. Barium ferrites are robust ceramics that are generally stable to moisture and corrosion-resistant. They are used in e.g. loudspeaker magnets and as a medium for magnetic recording, e.g. on magnetic stripe cards.

Production
Ferrites are produced by heating a mixture of the oxides of the constituent metals at high temperatures, as shown in this idealized equation:
Fe2O3  +  ZnO   →   ZnFe2O4
In some cases, the mixture of finely-powdered precursors is pressed into a mold.  For barium and strontium ferrites, these metals are typically supplied as their carbonates, BaCO3 or SrCO3. During the heating process, these carbonates undergo calcination:
MCO3 → MO + CO2
After this step, the two oxides combine to give the ferrite.  The resulting mixture of oxides undergoes sintering.

Processing
Having obtained the ferrite, the cooled product is milled to particles smaller than 2 µm, sufficiently small that each particle consists of a single magnetic domain. Next the powder is pressed into a shape, dried, and re-sintered. The shaping may be performed in an external magnetic field, in order to achieve a preferred orientation of the particles (anisotropy).

Small and geometrically easy shapes may be produced with dry pressing. However, in such a process small particles may agglomerate and lead to poorer magnetic properties compared to the wet pressing process. Direct calcination and sintering without re-milling is possible as well but leads to poor magnetic properties.

Electromagnets are pre-sintered as well (pre-reaction), milled and pressed. However, the sintering takes place in a specific atmosphere, for instance one with an oxygen shortage. The chemical composition and especially the structure vary strongly between the precursor and the sintered product.

To allow efficient stacking of product in the furnace during sintering and prevent parts sticking together, many manufacturers separate ware using ceramic powder separator sheets. These sheets are available in various materials such as alumina, zirconia and magnesia. They are also available in fine, medium and coarse particle sizes. By matching the material and particle size to the ware being sintered, surface damage and contamination can be reduced while maximizing furnace loading.

Uses
Ferrite cores are used in electronic inductors, transformers, and electromagnets where the high electrical resistance of the ferrite leads to very low eddy current losses. 

Ferrites are also found as a lump in a computer cable, called a ferrite bead, which helps to prevent high frequency electrical noise (radio frequency interference) from exiting or entering the equipment; these types of ferrites are made with lossy materials to not just block (reflect), but also absorb and dissipate as heat, the unwanted higher-frequency energy.

Early computer memories stored data in the residual magnetic fields of hard ferrite cores, which were assembled into arrays of core memory. Ferrite powders are used in the coatings of magnetic recording tapes.

Ferrite particles are also used as a component of radar-absorbing materials or coatings used in stealth aircraft and in the absorption tiles lining the rooms used for electromagnetic compatibility measurements. 
Most common audio magnets, including those used in loudspeakers and electromagnetic instrument pickups, are ferrite magnets. Except for certain "vintage" products, ferrite magnets have largely displaced the more expensive Alnico magnets in these applications. In particular, for hard hexaferrites today the most common uses are still as permanent magnets in refrigerator seal gaskets, microphones and loud speakers, small motors for cordless appliances and in automobile applications.

Ferrite nanoparticles exhibit superparamagnetic properties.

History
Yogoro Kato and Takeshi Takei of the Tokyo Institute of Technology synthesized the first ferrite compounds in 1930.  This led to the founding of TDK Corporation in 1935, to manufacture the material.

Barium hexaferrite (BaO•6Fe2O3) was discovered in 1950 at the Philips Natuurkundig Laboratorium (Philips Physics Laboratory).  The discovery was somewhat accidental—due to a mistake by an assistant who was supposed to be preparing a sample of hexagonal lanthanum ferrite for a team investigating its use as a semiconductor material.  On discovering that it was actually a magnetic material, and confirming its structure by X-ray crystallography, they passed it on to the magnetic research group.  Barium hexaferrite has both high coercivity (170 kA/m) and low raw material costs.  It was developed as a product by Philips Industries (Netherlands) and from 1952 was marketed under the trade name Ferroxdure.  The low price and good performance led to a rapid increase in the use of permanent magnets.

In the 1960s Philips developed strontium hexaferrite (SrO•6Fe2O3), with better properties than barium hexaferrite.  Barium and strontium hexaferrite dominate the market due to their low costs.  Other materials have been found with improved properties.  BaO•2(FeO)•8(Fe2O3) came in 1980. and Ba2ZnFe18O23 came in 1991.

See also
Ferromagnetic material properties
Cobalt Ferrite

References

External links

International Magnetics Association
What are the bumps at the end of computer cables?

Sources
MMPA 0100-00, Standard Specifications for Permanent Magnet Materials
Meeldijk, Victor Electronic Components: Selection and Application Guidelines, 1997 Wiley 
Ott, Henry Noise Reduction Techniques in Electronic Systems 1988 Wiley 
Luecke, Gerald and others General Radiotelephone Operator License Plus Radar Endorsement 2004, Master Pub. 
Bartlett, Bruce and others Practical Recording Techniques 2005 Focal Press 
Schaller, George E. Ferrite Processing & Effects on Material Performance

Ceramic materials
Ferromagnetic materials
Types of magnets
Loudspeakers
Ferrites